Rumer may refer to:
 Rumer (musician) (born 1979), British singer
 Rumer Willis (born 1988), American actress, daughter of Bruce Willis and Demi Moore
 Rumer Godden (1907–1998), English author
 Yuriy Rumer (1901–1985), Russian physicist also known as Georg Rumer

See also
 Rumer Hill Junction, a canal junction on the Cannock Extension Canal where the Churchbridge Branch left to join the Hatherton Canal, England
 Rumor, spelled rumour in British English